The Ciriya Tirumatal is a Tamil Hindu work of literature penned by Thirumangai Alvar, one of the twelve Alvars of Sri Vaishnavism. The work is a part of the compendium of hymns called the Naalayira Divya Prabandham. In the forty hymns of this work, the author expresses his devotion and love to the preserver deity, Vishnu, and also lists twenty-seven sites he would like to visit to venerate the deity.

Hymns

Theme 
Along with its companion poem called the Periya Tirumatal, the Ciriya Tirumatal employs a poetic device from Sangam literature called the maṭal. This referred to an ancient Tamil custom through which a lovesick man attempted to win the heart of his beloved by refusing food and drink, bathing, sleep, and other daily activities, and wandered the streets while singing about the woman he loved. In a last resort, the man expressed his willingness to take his own life in the presence of his beloved. The custom was romanticised, and hence traditionally ended with the woman being moved by the devotion of the man, agreeing to marry him. In this work, Tirumangai Alvar assumes the role of a gopika, a milk-maid lover of Krishna, and performs a maṭal to win the deity's heart. By doing so, he breaks the convention of women not being allowed to perform the custom, citing his adherence to the northern Sanskrit school of Sri Vaishnavism as opposed to the southern Tamil school.

A stanza of the Periya Tirumatal describes the legend of the Gajendra Moksha, Vishnu's rescue of an elephant from the jaws of a crocodile:

See also 

 Tiruvelukkutrirukkai
 Periya Tirumatal
 Kanninun Cirutampu

References 

Naalayira Divya Prabandham

Vaishnava texts
Sri Vaishnavism
Tamil Hindu literature